The President's Plane Is Missing is a 1973 American TV movie directed by Daryl Duke with a screenplay by Ernest Kinoy and Mark Carliner based upon the Robert J. Serling novel of the same name. It aired on the ABC Movie of the Week.

Plot
With diplomatic tensions building and the United States facing a possible military confrontation with China, Air Force One mysteriously crashes in the desert while heading to California, with President Jeremy Haines on board. While the crash is being investigated and with the president's fate yet uncertain, Vice President Kermit Madigan becomes acting president. Unfortunately, Haines had left him uninformed of current foreign policies. Madigan must now rely on Haines' cabinet and aides to fill him in on information he lacks, while the aides attempt to further their own agendas.

National Security Advisor George Oldenburg claims that Haines was preparing to go to war if the Chinese did not back down, while Secretary of State Freeman Sharkey asserts that Haines was pursuing a peaceful solution to the problem with China. Madigan's wife, Hester, sees this as an opportunity to advance his career, but the Washington political community doubts his competence. In dealing with growing tensions and conflicting advice, Madigan struggles to avoid a nuclear war with China. Meanwhile, it turns out that President Haines was not aboard the crashed plane after all.

Cast

 Buddy Ebsen as Vice President Kermit Madigan
 Peter Graves as Mark Jones
 Arthur Kennedy as Gunther Damon
 Raymond Massey as Secretary of State Freeman Sharkey
 Mercedes McCambridge as Second Lady Hester Madigan
 Rip Torn as National Security Advisor George Oldenburg
 Louise Sorel as Joanna Spencer
 Dabney Coleman as Senator Bert Haines
 Joseph Campanella as Colonel Doug Henderson
 Richard Eastham as General Colton
 Byron Morrow as Admiral Phillips
 Bill Walker as Thomas
 Richard Bull as First Controller
 Richard Stahl as Dentist
 Gil Peterson as Tower Controller
 Barry Cahill as Ground Crew Chief
 Lillian Lehman as Genesse
 James Sikking as Aide to Dunbar
 Barbara Leigh as WAF
 George Barrows as Mr. Meyers
 John Amos as Marine Corporal
 John Ward as Major D'Andrea
 Tod Andrews as President Jeremy Haines
 James Wainwright as General Ben Dunbar
 James B. Smith as Major Earl Foster

Novel

Robert J. Serling's 1967 novel spent multiple weeks on The New York Times Bestseller List and its success enabled Serling to become a full-time writer. Serling later penned a sequel to the novel entitled Air Force One Is Haunted, which centered around the ghost of President Franklin Roosevelt haunting the incumbent president whenever he boards Air Force One.

Production
The President's Plane Is Missing was completed for release in 1971, but due to then-President Richard Nixon's ongoing diplomatic relationship with and planned visit to China it was decided to postpone release of a film which painted China in a negative light until after Nixon's return from his visit to China.

The President's Plane Is Missing was released on October 23, 1973, as a period piece.

Reception
In Cinema and Nation, when comparing The President's Plane Is Missing  to such films as JFK (1991) and The Manchurian Candidate (1962) reviewers noted that while many films use a premise that actual democracy is an illusion, this one was rare in that it turned the president into an action hero.  In 1988, the reviewer for the Sydney Morning Herald wrote that it was a "dull film despite an excellent cast."

References

Notes

Bibliography

 Hjort, Mette and Scott  Mackenzie. Cinema and Nation. London: Routledge, 2005..
 McKenna, Michael. The ABC Movie of the Week: Big Movies for the Small Screen. Lanham, Maryland: Scarecrow Press, 2013. .

External links
 
 The President's Plane Is Missing at the Internet Movie Database

1973 films
1973 television films
1970s action thriller films
1970s action films
American aviation films
American television films
Action television films
Films about fictional presidents of the United States
Films based on American novels
Films directed by Daryl Duke
Films set in California
Films set in Washington, D.C.
Films set on airplanes
Films shot in Los Angeles
Films scored by Gil Mellé
Political thriller films
Films about the United States Air Force
United States presidential succession in fiction
Films about Air Force One
1970s English-language films
1970s American films